Language of Love is a 1969 Swedish sex educational film directed by Torgny Wickman. It was an international success.

It gained publicity when 30,000 people gathered on Trafalgar Square in London to protest against a nearby movie theatre showing it, one of the protesters being pop singer Cliff Richard. Lord Longford and Raymond Blackburn decided to pursue a matter of pornography classification for the film Language of Love into the Court of Appeal and lost the writ of mandamus against the Police Commissioner, who had refused to intrude upon the British Board of Film Classification remit.
United States customs were known to have confiscated copies of the film. Following such events, it was marketed as a sexploitation film of the "white coater" variety in some places – a pornographic film masquerading as a documentary or scientific film.

The film had two sequels, Mera ur kärlekens språk in 1970 and Kärlekens XYZ in 1971. In 1973 the three films were edited together into a new film, Det bästa ur Kärlekens språk-filmerna ("The Best from the Language of Love Films").

Mera ur kärlekens språk (More from the Language of Love) had equally successful box office though it dealt more with alternate sexuality and lifestyles and also with the disabled.

Remakes of the first two films appeared in 2004 (Kärlekens språk a.k.a. Kärlekens språk 2000) and in 2009 (Mera ur kärlekens språk), both directed by Anders Lennberg.

The film included split screen visions of couples having sex with Ravel's Bolero playing in the background.

Cast
 Inge Hegeler
 Sten Hegeler
 Maj-Briht Bergström-Walan
 Sture Cullhed
 Barbro Hiort af Ornäs
 Stig Johanson
 Göthe Grefbo
 Gösta Krantz
 Julie Bernby
 Börje Nyberg
 Lennart Lindberg
 Margaretha Henriksson
 Conny Ling

References

External links
 
 
 

Swedish documentary films
1969 films
Swedish erotic films
Sexploitation films
1960s Swedish-language films
1969 documentary films
Documentary films about sexuality
Sexual revolution
1960s Swedish films